Allen Williamson Bridge is the name of a memorial bridge in Payne County, Oklahoma, named after a former State Representative who served in the Oklahoma State House of Representatives from 1966 - 1974. This politician should not be confused with a similarly named Oklahoma State Senator. It is accompanied by a monument on one end of the structure and a memorial plaque placed by the Cimarron Valley Historical Society. The bridge was dedicated on December 31, 1974. The location is marked by steep rust-colored hills overlooking the Cimarron River, populated by a medium coverage of trees and other foliage. The bridge is of moderate size and of concrete construction, serving as a conduit for a two-lane highway.

References

External links
 Photos and history of the bridge
 A topographic map centered on this bridge from TopoQuest.com.

Bridges completed in 1974
Buildings and structures in Payne County, Oklahoma
Road bridges in Oklahoma
Concrete bridges in the United States